Gisèle d'Ailly van Waterschoot van der Gracht (11 September 1912 – 28 May 2013), also known by the mononym Gisèle, was a Dutch visual artist. During World War II, she operated a safe house out of her home for a group of young Jewish people in Amsterdam.

Biography 
Gisèle van Waterschoot van der Gracht was born in The Hague, Netherlands in 1912. Her mother, Josephine von Hammer Purgstall, was a baroness. Her father, Willem Waterschoot van der Gracht, was a geologist who worked for Royal Dutch Shell. She spent a period of her youth living in the United States and returned to the Netherlands after the 1929 stock market crash. Back in Europe, she studied the art of stained glass with Joep Nicholas and befriended Dutch poet Adriaan Roland Holst. She also completed a year of studies at the École des Beaux Arts in Paris. Her work was included in the 1939 exhibition and sale Onze Kunst van Heden (Our Art of Today) at the Rijksmuseum in Amsterdam.

 In 1940, van Waterschoot rented a small apartment on the third floor of the building Herengracht 401 in central Amsterdam. Soon after, the Nazi occupation of the Netherlands began. For the duration of the war, van Waterschoot secretly housed several people in her apartment including Wolfgang Frommel (a German poet, who was not Jewish), Jewish teenager Claus Victor Bock, Jewish writer Friedrich W. Buri, and others. While in hiding, the group of artists and writers codenamed their shelter "Castrum Peregrini" and covertly studied art and literature. The members of the group survived the war. After the end of World War II, van Waterschoot bought the apartment building to convert to a single home where she lived and worked on and off for the rest of her life. She later donated the building to the Castrum Peregrini foundation, which operates as a cultural center.

Van Waterschoot supported herself and her lodgers during the war by selling commissioned paintings. Afterwards, she designed several stained glass windows including for the Begijnhof Chapel and the Krijtberg Church. In 1946, her work was featured in a group exhibition at Schaeffer Galleries in New York. van Waterschoot was friends with artist Max Beckmann and stored some of his paintings during his long period of exile from Germany. Starting in the 1960s until the 1980s, van Waterschoot spent several months each year painting and doing restoration work at an old monastery on the Greek island Paros.

In 1959, van Waterschoot married Arnold Jan d'Ailly, who was mayor of Amsterdam from 1946 to 1956. van Waterschoot died in 2013 in Amsterdam.

In honor of her actions during the war, van Waterschoot was named a Knight of the Order of Orange-Nassau. She received the Righteous Among the Nations recognition in 1997. Several institutions hold her artwork including the Castrum Peregrini foundation, Centraal Museum Utrecht, and Museum Van Loon. In 2018, a biography of van Waterschoot titled De eeuw van Gisèle (The Century of Gisèle) was published by Annet Mooij.

References

External links 
 Photographs of d'Ailly in her home and studio
 Documentary about d'Ailly (in Dutch)

1912 births
2013 deaths
Dutch artists
Dutch Righteous Among the Nations
Dutch women artists
Dutch centenarians
Women centenarians
20th-century Dutch women